Cerdanyola del Vallès Futbol Club is a Spanish football team based in Cerdanyola del Vallès, Barcelona, in the autonomous community of Catalonia. Founded in 2006, it plays in Tercera División – Group 5, holding home games at Estadi Municipal La Bòbila-Pinetons.

History 
The club was founded in June 2006 as a result of the merger of Centro de Deportes Cerdanyola, UE Fontetes, EFUD Cerdanyola, CF Baroja and EF Cerdanyolense-Montflorit. Five clubs made it possible to create a more powerful entity at the Catalan sports scene.

Season to season

2 season in Segunda División RFEF
8 seasons in Tercera División

References

External links
Official website 
La Preferente team profile 
Soccerway team profile

Football clubs in Catalonia
Association football clubs established in 2006
2006 establishments in Spain